is a passenger railway station in the city of Koga, Ibaraki, Japan, operated by East Japan Railway Company (JR East).

Lines
Is the only station that the line has in Ibaraki Prefecture.

Station layout
The station consists of two elevated island platforms, with the station building underneath. The station has a Midori no Madoguchi staffed ticket office.

Platforms

History
Koga Station opened on 16 July 1885. The station was rebuilt with elevated tracks in 1984. On 1 April 1987 the station came under the control of JR East with the privatization of Japanese National Railways (JNR).

Passenger statistics
In fiscal 2019, the station was used by an average of 13,050 passengers daily (boarding passengers only).

Surrounding area
 Koga City Hall
 Koga Post Office
 Koga History Museum
 JGSDF Camp Koga

See also
 List of railway stations in Japan

References

External links

  JR East Station information 

Railway stations in Ibaraki Prefecture
Utsunomiya Line
Stations of East Japan Railway Company
Railway stations in Japan opened in 1885
Koga, Ibaraki